The 1st Bodil Awards was held at the Palace Hotel's night club Ambassadeur in Copenhagen, Denmark, honoring the best in Danish and foreign film of 1947. Jenny and the Soldier took home three awards, winning Best Danish Film, Best Actor in a Leading Role and Best Actress in a Leading Role. Ta', hvad du vil ha' took home both awards for supporting performances. The event was hosted by Lilian Harvey and Victor Borge.

Winners and nominees

Best Danish Film 
 Soldaten og Jenny – Johan Jacobsen (director)

Best Actor in a Leading Role 
 Poul Reichhardt – Soldaten og Jenny

Best Actress in a Leading Role 
 Bodil Kjer – Soldaten og Jenny

Best Actor in a Supporting Role 
 Ib Schønberg – Ta', hvad du vil ha'

Best Actress in a Supporting Role 
 Ellen Gottschalch –  Ta', hvad du vil ha'

Best European Film 
A Matter of Life and Death

Best American Film 
 The Best Years of Our Lives – William Wyler

References

External links 
 1st Bodil Awards at the official Bodil Awards website

Bodil Awards ceremonies
1947 film awards
1948 in Denmark
1940s in Copenhagen